Long, Last, Happy: New and Selected Stories is a 2010 collection of short stories by the American author Barry Hannah. It includes a selection of stories from his four earlier collections, Airships (1978), Captain Maximus (1985), Bats Out of Hell (1993), and High Lonesome (1996), along with one early work never published before in volume form and four new stories. It was published in December 2010 by Grove Press, after Hannah's death in March earlier that year.

Contents 
The collection contains 31 stories in total. No editor is credited, and no introduction is provided. "Trek", which had never been published in volume form, first appeared in The Arrowhead, a student publication at Mississippi College, in 1964. Many of the other stories appeared in periodicals before being published in Hannah's earlier collections. 

The four new stories, according to the publisher, are from "the final manuscripts Hannah left behind". A starred review in Publishers Weekly states that the new stories "can be read as a set of interlocking narratives, each presenting a different angle on a series of arson attacks on small churches."

1964-1978: Airships and Before 
 Trek
 Water Liars
 Love Too Long
 Testimony of Pilot
 Coming Close to Donna
 Dragged Fighting from His Tomb
 Midnight and I'm Not Famous Yet
 Knowing He Was Not My Kind Yet I Followed
 Behold the Husband in His Perfect Agony
 Mother Rooney Unscrolls the Hurt

1979-1985: Captain Maximus 
 Getting Ready
 Even Greenland
 Ride, Fly, Penetrate, Loiter
 Fans

1986-1993: Bats Out of Hell  
 High-Water Railers
 Two Things, Dimly, Were Going at Each Other
 Bats Out of Hell Division 
 Evening of the Yarp: A Report by Roonswent Dover
 Mother Mouth
 Rat-Faced Auntie
 Scandale d'estime 
 Hey, Have You Got a Cig, the Time, the News, My Face?

1993-1996: High Lonesome  
 Get Some Young 
 A Creature in the Bay of St. Louis 
 Two Gone Over
 Drummer Down
 Uncle High Lonesome

2000s: Long, Last, Happy: New Stories 
 Fire Water
 Sick Soldier at Your Door
 Lastward, Deputy James
 Rangoon Green
 Publisher's Note

Critical reception 

The collection received positive reviews in Publishers Weekly, The New York Times Book Review, The New York Times, The Wall Street Journal, The Los Angeles Times, Slate, and NPR. Reviewers focused on Hannah's ability as a prose stylist, the density and conciseness of his short stories, his influence on other writers, and the effectiveness of the collection in providing an introduction to Hannah's work.

References  

2010 short story collections
Grove Press books